The playable cast of the SNK vs. Capcom fighting games all previously appeared in other games (not necessarily fighting games), with each company's flagship fighting game series providing most of the characters.

Characters from Street Fighter
 Akuma (豪鬼)
 Voice Actor: Tomomichi Nishimura
 Balrog (マイク・バイソン)
 Voice Actor: Kōichi Yamadera, Sounosuke Nagashiro
 Blanka (ブランカ)
 Voice Actor: Yuji Ueda
 Cammy White (キャミィ)
 Voice Actor: Susan Hart (director), Miki Nagasawa
 Chun-Li (春麗)
 Voice Actor: Neya Michiko, Mari Jitsukawa
 Dan Hibiki (火引 弾)
 Voice Actor: Osamu Hosoi
 Dhalsim (ダルシム)
 Voice Actor: Yoshiharu Yamada, Eiji Yano
 Eagle (イーグル)
 Voice Actor: Jin Yamanoi
 Edmond Honda (エドモンド 本田)
 Voice Actor: Masashi Sugawara
 Evil Ryu
 Voice Actor: Toshiyuki Morikawa
 Guile (ガイル)
 Voice Actor: Kōichi Yamadera, Takenosuke Nishikawa
 Ken Masters (ケン・マスターズ)
 Voice Actor: Yuuji Kishi, Monster Maezuka
 M. Bison (ベガ)
 Voice Actor: Norio Wakamoto
 Ryu (リュウ)
 Voice Actor: Toshiyuki Morikawa
 Sagat (サガット)
 Voice Actor: Shin-ichiro Miki, Kouji Suizu
 Sakura Kasugano (春日野 さくら)
 Voice Actor: Yuko Sasamoto
 Shin Akuma
 Voice Actor: Tomomichi Nishimura
 Vega (バルログ)
 Voice Actor: Yuji Ueda, Kiyotomi Narikinya
 Yun Lee (ユン・リー)
 Voice Actor: Kentarou Itou
 Zangief (ザンギエフ)
 Voice Actor: Tesshō Genda

Characters from Final Fight 
 Hugo Andore (ヒューゴー)
 Voice Actor: Wataru Takagi
 Maki Genryusai (マキ)
 Voice Actor: Miki Nagasawa
 Rolento Schugerg (ロレント)
 Voice Actor: Jin Yamanoi

Characters from The King of Fighters 
 Benimaru Nikaido (二階堂 紅丸)
 Voice Actor: Monster Maezuka
 Chang Koehan (チャン・コーハン)
 Voice Actor: Hiroyuki Arita
 Choi Bounge (チョイ・ボンゲ)
 Voice Actor: Monster Maezuka
 Goenitz (ゲーニッツ)
 Voice Actor: Yoshinori Shima
 Iori Yagami (八神 庵)
 Voice Actor: Kunihiko Yasui
 Kyo Kusanagi (草薙 京)
 Voice Actor: Masahiro Nonaka
 Leona Heidern (レオナ)
 Voice Actor: Masae Yumi
 Orochi Iori
 Voice Actor: Kunihiko Yasui
 Rugal Bernstein (ルガール・バーンシュタイン)
 Voice Actor: Toshimitsu Arai
 Vice (バイス)
 Voice Actor: Masae Yumi

Characters from Fatal Fury 
 Geese Howard (ギース・ハワード)
 Voice Actor: Kong Kuwata
 Joe Higashi (ジョー・ヒガシ)
 Voice Actor: Nobuyuki Hiyama
 Kim Kaphwan (キム・カッファン)
 Voice Actor: Satoshi Hashimoto
 Mai Shiranui (不知火 舞)
 Voice Actor: Akoya Sogi
 Raiden (ライデン)
 Voice Actor: John Hulaton
 Rock Howard (ロック・ハワード)
 Voice Actor: Eiji Takemoto
 Ryuji Yamazaki (山崎 竜二)
 Voice Actor: Kouji Ishii
 Terry Bogard (テリー・ボガード)
 Voice Actor: Satoshi Hashimoto

Characters from Art of Fighting 
 Kasumi Todoh (藤堂 香澄)
 Voice Actor: Masae Yumi
 King
 Voice Actor: Harumi Ikoma
 Mr. Karate (ミスター・カラテ)
 Voice Actor: Eiji Tsuda
 Ryo Sakazaki (リョウ・サカザキ)
 Voice Actor: Masaki Usui
 Ryuhaku Todoh (藤堂 竜白)
 Voice Actor: Takeshi Aono
 Yuri Sakazaki (ユリ・サカザキ)
 Voice Actor: Kaori Horie

Characters from Psycho Soldier 
 Athena Asamiya (麻宮 アテナ)
 Voice Actor: Haruna Ikezawa

Characters from Darkstalkers 
 Baby Bonnie Hood
 Demitri Maximoff
 Voice Actor: Nobuyuki Hiyama
 Felicia
 Voice Actor: Kae Araki
 Morrigan Aensland
 Voice Actor: Yayoi Jinguji

Characters from Samurai Shodown 
 Earthquake (アースクエイク)
 Voice Actor: Masaki Usui
 Genjuro Kibagami (牙神 幻十郎)
 Voice Actor: Kong Kuwata
 Haohmaru (覇王丸)
 Voice Actor: Daiki Nakamura
 Nakoruru (ナコルル)
 Voice Actor: Harumi Ikoma
 Shiki (色)
 Voice Actor: Kaori Minami

Characters from The Last Blade 
 Akari Ichijou (一条 あかり)
 Hibiki Takane (高嶺 響)
 Voice Actor: Kyoko Hikami

Characters from Rival Schools 
 Kyosuke Kagami
 Voice Actor: Isshin Chiba

Characters from Red Earth 
 Tessa
 Voice Actor: Kie Sakura

Characters from Metal Slug 
 Mars People (マーズピープル)

Characters from Mega Man 
 Zero
 Voice Actor: Yuuto Kazama

Characters from Athena 
 Athena (アテナ)
 Voice Actor: Mie Itou

Characters from Ghosts 'n Goblins 
Red Arremer (レッドアリーマー)
 Voice Actor: Kiyotomi Narikinya

Original Characters
 Shin Mr. Karate (known in-game as "Honki ni Natta Mr. Karate or Serious Mr. Karate)
 Voice Actor: Eiji Tsuda
 Ultimate Rugal (known in Japan as "God Rugal")
 Voice Actor: Toshimitsu Arai
 Violent Ken
 Voice Actor: Monster Maezuka

Lists of Capcom characters
Lists of SNK characters
Fighting game characters